Childwickbury is a hamlet in Hertfordshire, England lying to the north of St Albans in the parish of St Michael.

Childwickbury Manor was home to Stanley Kubrick from 1978 until his death there in 1999.

Many of the buildings in Childwickbury are listed, including the well on the Green.

External links
 Childwickbury Arts Fair
 Childwickbury Estate

Hamlets in Hertfordshire
City of St Albans